Zhang Jingyi (born 10 July 1999), is a Chinese actress. She graduated from Beijing Film Academy class of 2017. In 2018, she signed onto K.ARTISTS, an agent co-established by Chen Kun and Zhou Xun. She is known for her role in a Romantic drama, Lighter and Princess (2022) as Zhu Yun.

Filmography

Film

Television series

References

External links 

Living people
1999 births
Chinese film actresses
Chinese television actresses
Beijing Film Academy alumni
People from Shaoyang